Mario Garba (born 13 February 1977 in Sisak) is a Croatian retired professional footballer who last played for Croatian club NK Lekenik.

Club career
Garba started with football in his native Sisak, with HNK Segesta before moving to the then-upward bound lower-tier side TŠK from the nearby village of Topolovac. TŠK was eventually promoted to the Prva HNL for the 2001/2002 season, and, having participated in 16 matches with 3 goals, he was picked up by NK Kamen Ingrad. After a 1.5 years in Velika, he played mostly for a series of Druga HNL teams, with short stints in Japan's Cerezo Osaka and PAS Hamedan F.C. in the Iran Pro League.

References

External links
 

1977 births
Living people
People from Sisak
Association football midfielders
Croatian footballers
NK TŠK Topolovac players
NK Kamen Ingrad players
HNK Segesta players
Cerezo Osaka players
NK Croatia Sesvete players
NK Hrvatski Dragovoljac players
PAS Hamedan F.C. players
NK Imotski players
NK Međimurje players
First Football League (Croatia) players
Croatian Football League players
J1 League players
Persian Gulf Pro League players
Croatian expatriate footballers
Expatriate footballers in Japan
Croatian expatriate sportspeople in Japan
Expatriate footballers in Iran
Croatian expatriate sportspeople in Iran